Chapareia pinima is a species of beetle in the family Cerambycidae, and the only species in the genus Chapareia. It was described by Lane in 1950.

References

Anisocerini
Beetles described in 1950
Monotypic Cerambycidae genera